The Asian/Pacific American Awards for Literature (APAAL) are a set of literary awards presented annually by the Asian Pacific American Librarians Association (APALA). The APALA was formed in 1980 "to create an organization that would address the needs of Asian/Pacific American librarians and those who serve Asian/Pacific American communities." The Association was the successor to the Asian American Librarians Caucus (AALC), a discussion group within the American Library Association (ALA) Office for Library Outreach Services that focused on providing library service to minority communities and on supporting minority librarians. The APALA incorporated in 1981 (in Illinois) and became part of the ALA in 1982.
	
	The awards honor books about Asian/Pacific Americans, their history and culture. Categories have included fiction and non-fiction for adults, picture/illustrated books, and children's/young-adult literature. Writers and artists do not need to be of Asian or Pacific Islander ancestry, but they must be U.S. citizens or permanent residents, the books must be about Asian/Pacific American heritage, and must have been written in English and published for general release within the States.

Winners

References

American literary awards
Asian-American culture